The Catholic Church in Togo is part of the worldwide Catholic Church, under the spiritual leadership of the Pope in Rome.

There are approximately 1,483,000 million Catholics representing approximately 25 percent of the total population of 5,968,000.  There are seven dioceses, including one archdiocese:

Lomé
 Aného
 Atakpamé
 Dapaong
 Kara
 Kpalimé
 Sokodé

References

 
Togo
Togo